secunet Security Networks AG commonly known as Secunet, is a German information security corporation headquartered in Essen. Secunet develops, manufactures and sells information security hardware and secure telecommunications equipment. It is the producer and vendor of Germany's SINA infrastructure that forms the basis for Germany's secure IT networks. Secunet is Germany's biggest information security company and provides services for the public administration and private entreprises the country. The company is public stock index listed in the SDAX.

Secunet was founded in 1997 as a spin-off of the IT division of the former TÜV Mitte AG. In 2021 it generated a revenue of 337.6 million Euro and had more than 1,000 employees, thus making it the biggest information security company in Germany. Within Germany Secunet has seats in Berlin, Bonn, Borchen, Dresden, Eschborn, Hamburg, Munich and Siegen.

Products and services 
With its products and services, secunet primarily focusses clients in the public administration and ministries, the healthcare sector, the defence and space sector as well as specifically security and police agencies.

Secure Networking 
One of Secunet's premier products is the SINA (Secure Inter-Network Architecture) product line that was co-developed with Germany's Federal Office for Information Security (BSI). The SINA architecture forms the basis for Germany's classified information networks and is used in a broad range of public institutions in Germany and abroad. The architecture is accredited up the NATO and EU SECRET classifications and includes network encryptors and work stations as well as communication devices, such as encrypted phones.

Border Control 
Secunet is the producer of EasyPASS, an automated border control system used at airports and border check points in Germany and a number of EU countries.

Consulting 
Secunet's services include information security consulting, assessments and penetration testing.

Healtcare 
Germany's electronic healthcare infrastructure is partially based on Secunet products.

External links 

 secunet Security Solutions

References 

de:Secunet Security Networks

Companies based in North Rhine-Westphalia
Companies based in Essen
Information technology consulting firms of Germany
ICT service providers
Software companies of Germany
Networking hardware companies
Networking software companies
Computer security companies